An Andalusian Gentleman (Spanish:Un caballero andaluz) is a 1954 Spanish musical film directed by Luis Lucia and starring Jorge Mistral, Carmen Sevilla and Manuel Luna.

The film's sets were designed by the art directors Gil Parrondo and Luis Pérez Espinosa.

Synopsis
A former bullfighter, desolated after the dead of his son, finds a little hope in Esperanza, a young gypsy girl that earns money hardly for her family.

When he realizes that Esperanza is blind and that the gypsies are never educated, he decides to build a school.

There are six songs in the film.

Cast
 Jorge Mistral as Juan Manuel de Almodóvar  
 Carmen Sevilla as Esperanza 'Colorín'  
 Manuel Luna as Don Elías, el párroco  
 Julia Caba Alba as Dolores  
 José Isbert as Joaquín  
 Casimiro Hurtado as Curro  
 Bobby Deglané as Locutor de radio (voice)  
 José Prada as Agregado militar  
 Irene Caba Alba as Señora Acacia  
 Jaime Blanch as José Luis de Almodóvar 
 Valeriano Andrés as Doctor 
 Francisco Bernal as Espectador en la plaza  
 Ricardo Blasco as Espectador en la plaza  
 Rafael Cortés as Oculista  
 José Luis López Vázquez
 Antonio Ozores as Espectador en la plaza 
 Francisco Pierrá as Empresario

References

Bibliography
 Mira, Alberto. The A to Z of Spanish Cinema. Rowman & Littlefield, 2010.

External links 

1954 films
Spanish musical films
1954 musical films
1950s Spanish-language films
Films directed by Luis Lucia
Cifesa films
Films scored by Juan Quintero Muñoz
1950s Spanish films